The Kew Bolmer is an apartment building located in Kew Gardens, Queens.

Two brothers, Aldrick Man and Albon Man Jr., decided to lay out a new community in the vicinity of an old golf course in Queens, and first called it Kew but then changed it to Kew Gardens, after the well-known botanical gardens in England. Soon the first apartment building in Kew Gardens was created, the Kew Bolmer. It is located at 80-45 Kew Gardens Road. The Kew Bolmer was erected in 1915, and still stands today, at the intersection of Kew Gardens Road, and Queens Boulevard.

See also
OldKewGardens.com Full of pictures of Kew Gardens and the Kew Bolmer.

Residential buildings in Queens, New York